Alberta Tinsley-Talabi (born August 14, 1954) served three terms in the Michigan House of Representatives representing District 2, which includes the cities of Grosse Pointe, Grosse Pointe Farms, Grosse Pointe Park and a portion of Detroit. She was a member of the Detroit City Council from 1993 to 2009 and served as a Wayne County Commissioner from 1987 to 1990.

Tinsley-Talabi was first elected to the State House in 2010 to the 3rd District and re-elected in 2012 to the 2nd District following redistricting.

She has received over 100 National and Local awards received for leadership in the area of Substance Abuse Prevention and Community Service including: United States Office of Drug Czar Presidential Award, National Council on Alcoholism Detroit and Vicinity 2 time award recipient, Scenic America National Award for Beautification State of Michigan House Resolution, and Partnership For a Drug Free Detroit Leadership Award 2 time recipient.

References

External links
Official House Website
Vote Smart entry on Tinsley-Talabi

Living people
County commissioners in Michigan
Democratic Party members of the Michigan House of Representatives
Detroit City Council members
Women state legislators in Michigan
1954 births
African-American state legislators in Michigan
Women city councillors in Michigan
21st-century American politicians
21st-century American women politicians
African-American city council members in Michigan
21st-century African-American women
21st-century African-American politicians
20th-century African-American people
20th-century African-American women